The Almighty Defenders is a supergroup consisting of the Black Lips and The King Khan & BBQ Show formed in February 2009 in Berlin, Germany.

Discography

The Almighty Defenders (2009)
 All My Loving - 3:08
 The Ghost With The Most - 4:05
 Bow Down And Die - 4:07
 Cone Of Light - 3:22
 Jihad Blues - 2:01
 30 Second Air Blast - 1:42
 Death Cult Soup n' Salad - 1:20
 I'm Coming Home - 3:12
 Over The Horizon - 1:46
 She Came Before Me - 3:26
 The Great Defender - 4:58

References
 
 allmusic. [ Almighty Defenders Biography] "www.allmusic.com". Accessed September 17, 2009.

Musical groups established in 2009
Gospel music groups